Sun Huan (194–234), courtesy name Jiming, was a military general of the state of Eastern Wu during the Three Kingdoms period. He was the fourth son of Sun Jing, uncle of Sun Quan, the founding emperor of Wu, and a younger brother of Sun Jiao (孫皎).

Life 

Born in the county of Wu, he was raised to be a soldier for the glory of the Sun family. In 212, his elder brother Jiao was promoted to general and left in charge of Xiakou in Jiangxia, replacing the general Cheng Pu (程普) who had organised the defences of this territory after it was transferred to Liu Bei, two years earlier. Sun Huan entered military service serving under his elder brother Jiao for several years. In 219, Jiao died and he inherited the command of Jiao's men. He was then named General of the Household and acted as Administrator of Jiangxia.  He was tasked with protecting the contested border with Wei. He distinguished himself against Shu in the battle of Yiling under Lu Xun in 222. In 226, despite Sun Quan's unsuccessful campaign to seize northern Jiangxia, he captured three Wei generals at Shiyang and was then enfeoffed for his achievements.

He died in 234 and was well remembered by the people of Wu, who praised him for promoting scholarship in Jiangxia.

See also 

 Lists of people of the Three Kingdoms
 Eastern Wu family trees#Sun Jing (Youtai)

Notes

References 

 Chen, Shou (3rd century). Records of the Three Kingdoms (Sanguozhi).
 De Crespigny, Rafe (2007). A Biographical Dictionary of Later Han to The Three Kingdoms 23-220 AD. Leiden: Brill.    .

194 births
234 deaths
Eastern Wu generals